Library Exchange Format (LEF) is a specification for representing the physical layout of an integrated circuit in an ASCII format. It includes design rules and abstract information about the standard cells.  

LEF only has the basic information required at that level to serve the purpose of the concerned CAD tool. It helps in saving valuable resources by providing only an abstract view and thus consuming less memory overhead. LEF is used in conjunction with Design Exchange Format (DEF) to represent the complete physical layout of an  integrated circuit while it is being designed. 

LEF originated by Tangent for their Place and Route (P&R) tools, which were bought by Cadence Design Systems.

References 

EDA file formats